This is a list of Ukrainian football transfers winter 2020–21. Only clubs in 2020–21 Ukrainian Premier League are included.

Ukrainian Premier League

Desna Chernihiv

In:

Out:

Dnipro-1

In:

Out:

Dynamo Kyiv

In:

Out:

Inhulets Petrove

In:

Out:

Kolos Kovalivka

In:

Out:

Lviv

In:

Out:

Mariupol

In:

Out:

Mynai

In:

Out:

Oleksandriya

In:

Out:

Olimpik Donetsk

In:

Out:

Rukh Lviv

In:

Out:

Shakhtar Donetsk

In:

Out:

Vorskla Poltava

In:

Out:

Zorya Luhansk

In:

Out:

Ukrainian First League

Hirnyk-Sport Horishni Plavni

In:

Out:

Ukrainian Second League

FC Chernihiv 

In:

Out:

References

Ukraine
Transfers
2020-21